Lateralus is the third studio album by American rock band Tool. It was released on May 15, 2001, through Volcano Entertainment. The album was recorded at Cello Studios in Hollywood and The Hook, Big Empty Space, and The Lodge, in North Hollywood, between October 2000 and January 2001. David Bottrill, who had produced the band's two previous releases Ænima and Salival, produced the album along with the band, and became the last Tool album produced by Bottrill to date. On August 23, 2005, Lateralus was released as a limited edition two-picture-disc vinyl LP in a holographic gatefold package.

The album debuted at No. 1 on the Billboard 200 chart, selling more than 555,200 copies in its first week of release. It was certified double platinum by the RIAA on August 5, 2003. On February 13, 2015, the album was certified Gold by the BPI. It was also certified platinum in Australia, and double platinum in Canada. The band won the Grammy Award for Best Metal Performance for the song "Schism" in 2002. Lateralus was ranked No. 123 on the Rock and Roll Hall of Fame's "Definitive 200" list. This was also the only album of Tool's catalogue which did not featured the Parental Advisory sticker.

Background 
Lateralus emerged after a four-year legal dispute with Tool's label, Volcano Entertainment. In January 2001, the band announced that their new album's title would be Systema Encéphale and provided a 12-song track list with titles such as "Riverchrist", "Numbereft", "Encephatalis", "Musick", and "Coeliacus". File sharing networks such as Napster were flooded with bogus files bearing the titles' names. At the time, Tool members were outspokenly critical of file-sharing networks in general due to the negative impact on artists that are dependent on success in record sales to continue their career. During an interview with NY Rock in 2000, Keenan stated:
I think there are a lot of other industries out there that might deserve being destroyed. The ones who get hurt by MP3s are not so much companies or the business, but the artists, people who are trying to write songs.
A month later, the band revealed that the new album was actually titled Lateralus (supposedly a portmanteau of the leg muscle Vastus lateralis and the term lateral thinking) and that the name Systema Encéphale and the track list had been a ruse.

Lateralus and the corresponding tours would take Tool a step further toward art rock, and progressive rock territory, in contrast to the band's earlier material, which has often been labeled as alternative metal. The album has also been described as progressive metal. Rolling Stone wrote in an attempt to summarize the album that "Drums, bass and guitars move in jarring cycles of hyperhowl and near-silent death march ... The prolonged running times of most of Lateralus thirteen tracks are misleading; the entire album rolls and stomps with suitelike purpose." Joshua Klein of The A.V. Club in turn expressed his opinion that Lateralus, with its 79-minute running time and relatively complex and long songs—topped by the ten-and-a-half minute music video for "Parabola"—posed a challenge to fans and music programming alike. Drummer Danny Carey said, "The manufacturer would only guarantee us up to 79 minutes ... We thought we'd give them two seconds of breathing room." Carey aspired to create longer songs like those by artists he grew up listening to. The band had segues to place between songs, but had to cut out a lot during the mastering phase. The CD itself was mastered using HDCD technology.

Just as Salival was initially released with several errors on the track listing, early pressings of Lateralus had the ninth track incorrectly spelled as "Lateralis". The original title of "Reflection" was "Resolution" before being changed three months prior to the album's release.

The track listing is altered on the vinyl edition, with "Disposition" appearing at track 8. Because of the long running time, the double vinyl edition could not be released like the disc since the songs would not fit on each disc side in that order. By moving "Disposition" to an earlier point, the sides were balanced and could fit the material. However, this edit breaks the segue that occurs between "Disposition" and "Reflection", which, along with "Triad", are linked together on the tracklist.

Two of the singles from the album, "Parabola" and "Schism", are featured in the video game Guitar Hero World Tour.

The insert is translucent and flips open to reveal the different layers of the human body. Disguised in the brain matter on the final layer is the word "God". The artwork was done by artist Alex Grey, who would later design the 3D edition cover for the followup to Lateralus, 10,000 Days.

Composition and content 
Drummer Danny Carey sampled himself breathing through a tube to simulate the chanting of Buddhist monks for "Parabol", and banged piano strings for samples on "Reflection". "Faaip de Oiad" samples a recording of a 1997 call on Art Bell's radio program Coast to Coast AM. "Faaip de Oiad" is Enochian for The Voice of God.

"Disposition", "Reflection", and "Triad" form a sequence that has been performed in succession live with occasional help from various tourmates such as Mike Patton, Dave Lombardo, Buzz Osborne, Tricky, and members of Isis, Meshuggah, and King Crimson.

The title track, "Lateralus", incorporates the Fibonacci sequence. The theme of the song describes the desire of humans to explore and to expand for more knowledge and a deeper understanding of everything. The lyrics "spiral out" refer to this desire and also to the Fibonacci spiral, which is formed by creating and arranging squares for each number in the sequence's 1,1,2,3,5,8,... pattern, and drawing a curve that connects to two corners of each square. This would, allowed to continue onwards, theoretically create a never-ending and infinitely-expanding spiral. Related to this, the song's main theme features successive time signatures 9/8, 8/8, and 7/8. The number 987 is the sixteenth integer of the Fibonacci sequence.

"Eon Blue Apocalypse" is about Adam Jones's Great Dane named Eon, who had died from bone cancer. The track "Mantra" is the slowed-down sound of Maynard James Keenan gently squeezing one of his cats.

Release and reception 

Overall, Lateralus was met with generally favorable reviews by mainstream music critics upon its initial release. At Metacritic, which assigns a normalized rating out of 100 to reviews from critics, the album received an average score of 75, which indicates "generally favorable reviews", based on 15 reviews. Many of their responses mentioned the album's ambition and ability to confound listeners, such as Spin'''s Ryan Rayhil's summarization of it as a "monolithic puzzlebox". Rob Theakston reviewed the record for AllMusic, where he claimed that "Lateralus demands close listening from the first piece onward, as it becomes quickly apparent that this is not going to be an album one can listen to and accept at face value. Complex rhythm changes, haunting vocals, and an onslaught of changes in dynamics make this an album other so-called metal groups could learn from."

Terry Bezer praised Lateralus in a review for Drowned in Sound by comparing it to the band's previous album, Ænima, calling it "more focused and cunning record than its predecessors that in many ways puts everything the band have formerly produced into perspective." David Fricke of Rolling Stone also measured the album up to earlier works from the band's oeuvre; "Tool have everything it takes to beat you senseless; they proved it on 1993’s Undertow and their 1996 Grammy-winning beast, Aenima. Here, Tool go to extravagant lengths to drown you in sensation." In a review for Kerrang!, Dave Everly claimed "It’s the most perfectly played, perfectly produced record you’re likely to hear this or any other year" and that it was "one of the greatest albums you’ll hear in your lifetime." Writing for NME, Andy Capper also approved of it; "Lateralus has added a little more colour to their palette of chanting, drumming and high drama. Singer Maynard James Keenan has been unaffected by the comparative tunefulness of his side project A Perfect Circle, while the stripped-down nature of the instrumentation means that Tool's innate heaviness shines out in a world of production tricks and dodges. There's no trickery—Tool's progressiveness is all their own work."

While Lateralus was generally met with positive reception by many music reviewers, there were some who were very critical of the album. In the article for Pitchfork, Brent DiCrescenzo claimed that "With the early new century demanding 'opuses', Tool follows suit. The problem is, Tool defines 'opus' as taking their 'defining element' (wanking sludge) and stretching it out to the maximum digital capacity of a compact disc." Reviewing the album for the Village Voice, essayist Robert Christgau lambasted the album, calling it "meaning-mongering for the fantasy fiction set" The review published in Blender described the album as sounding like "Black Sabbath jamming with Genesis at the bottom of a coal shaft."

 Commercial performance 
The album was a commercial success in the United States, debuting at No. 1 on the U.S. Billboard 200 albums chart with over 555,200 copies sold in its first week of release. On August 5, 2003, the album was certified double platinum by the RIAA. On April 30, 2010, the album was certified gold by the BPI for sales of 100,000 in the U.K. In addition, Lateralus was certified platinum by the ARIA and double platinum by MC.

 Accolades 
Tool received the 2002 Grammy Award for Best Metal Performance for the song "Schism". During the band's acceptance speech, drummer Danny Carey stated that he would like to thank his parents "for putting up with [him]", and bassist Justin Chancellor concluded, "I want to thank my dad for doing my mom."Lateralus was named by many music publications in their 'End of Year' lists for 2001. Q listed Lateralus as one of the best 50 albums of 2001.

The album continued to gain accolades in the years following its release. It was placed on the "Best Albums of the 2000s" list for both Consequence of Sound in 2009 and Terrorizer in 2010, while also being listed on Kerrangs "100 Greatest Rock Albums" list in 2006. In 2016, Loudwire named Lateralus the  hard rock/metal album of the 21st century. The magazine also ranked it  on their "Top 25 Progressive Metal Albums of All Time."

Publications have also continued to praise the performances by the band members on the album.

 Special editions 
A vinyl edition and two DVD singles from the album were released later. The "double vinyl four-picture disc" edition of Lateralus was first released as a limited autographed edition exclusively available to fan club members and publicly released on August 23, 2005. Two music videos were produced; one for "Schism" (with the short ambient segue "Mantra" at the beginning) and one for "Parabol/Parabola". These were subsequently released as two separate DVD singles on December 20, 2005, featuring remixes of the tracks by Lustmord.

 Track listing 

Notes
 On the vinyl version of the album, "Disposition" follows "Parabola". 
 On the first presses of US CD, "Lateralus" is misspelled "Lateralis" on the tracklist of the outer packaging.
 On the digital version, "Triad" omits the two minutes of silence at the track's end, which brings the total time of the album 76:37.

 Members 
 Maynard James Keenan – vocals
 Adam Jones – guitars, art director
 Justin Chancellor – bass
 Danny Carey – drums, percussion, samples

Additional personnel
 Statik (Collide) – machines on "Triad"

 Production 
 David Bottrill – production, engineering, mixing
 Vince DeFranco – neurocistance, engineering
 Alex Grey – illustrations

 Charts Lateralus sold 555,000 copies in its first week, debuting at number one on the Billboard 200. As of July 7, 2010, Lateralus'' has sold 2,609,000 copies in the US. It is ranked number 123 on the Rock and Roll Hall of Fame's "Definitive 200" list.

Weekly charts

Year-end charts

Singles

Certifications

References

External links 

 

 

2001 albums
Volcano Entertainment albums
Tool (band) albums
Albums produced by David Bottrill
Albums with cover art by Alex Grey